Tom Mooney, nicknamed "Circus", was an American Negro league pitcher in the 1900s.

Mooney made his Negro leagues debut with the San Antonio Black Bronchos in 1908 and played for the club again the following season. In three recorded career appearances on the mound, he posted a 6.39 ERA over 12.2 innings.

References

External links
Baseball statistics and player information from Baseball-Reference Black Baseball Stats and Seamheads

Year of birth missing
Year of death missing
Place of birth missing
Place of death missing
San Antonio Black Bronchos players